The North American 5K Championships, also known as the North American 5 km Team Challenge, was an annual road running competition over 5 kilometres between three North American countries: Canada, Mexico and the United States.

The event was created in 2002 and held as part of the Arturo Barrios Invitational races each October in Chula Vista, California. It would be the permanent host of the competition, until the final edition in 2005. The competition had three elements: a men's 5K run, a women's 5K run, and a team competition. The team scores were decided by combining the finishing places of the top two men and top two women for each nation. The lowest overall score was the team winner. A total of three athletes could be entered per nation in each race.

All three participating nations won a team title over the competition's four-edition history, with Mexico winning the first, the United States the second, and Canada the final two titles. Mexico was the most successful in the men's race, having three wins, and Alejandro Suárez was the most successful male athlete with his back-to-back wins in 2003 and 2004. Canada was the most successful in the women's race, courtesy of Émilie Mondor's three straight wins from 2003 to 2005 and a runner-up place in 2002. The United States failed to win an individual title, despite being the host nation. Mondor set the women's championship record of 15:16 minutes in 2004 (also a Canadian national record), while Mexico's David Galván inaugural winning time of 13:47 minutes was never bettered.

Editions 

 American Lauren Fleshman was entered in the women's race, but was a non-starter.

Medallists

Men's individual

Women's individual

Team

References

Individual medalists
North American 5 Kilometres Challenge. GBR Athletics. Retrieved on 2015-03-20.

5K runs
5K runs in the United States
Athletics (track and field) competitions in North America
Athletics team events
North American international sports competitions
Annual sporting events in the United States
Defunct athletics competitions
Sports in Chula Vista, California
Sports competitions in San Diego County, California
Foot races in California
Recurring sporting events established in 2002
2002 establishments in California
2005 disestablishments in California
Recurring events disestablished in 2005